Józefin  is a village in the administrative district of Gmina Lipiany, within Pyrzyce County, West Pomeranian Voivodeship, in north-western Poland.

Before 1945 the area belonged to Germany as part of Landkreis Soldin in the Prussian Province of Brandenburg. For the history of the region, see Neumark.

References

Villages in Pyrzyce County